Ülar is an Estonian masculine given name.

People named Ülar include:
Ülar Mark (born 1968), architect
Ülar Ploom (born 1955), linguist and poet
Ülar Vomm (born 1962), military commander

See also
Üllar

Estonian masculine given names